Sidney is a town in Kennebec County, Maine, United States. The population was 4,645 at the 2020 census. Sidney was incorporated as a town on January 30, 1792. The town was named for Sir Philip Sidney, an English author. Sidney is included in the Augusta, Maine micropolitan New England City and Town Area. Since 1937, the town is the home of the New England Music Camp.

Geography

Demographics

2010 census

As of the census of 2010, there were 4,208 people, 1,607 households, and 1,196 families residing in the town. The racial makeup of the town was 98.0% White, 0.1% African American, 0.3% Native American, 0.3% Asian, 0.1% from other races, and 1.0% from two or more races. Hispanic or Latino of any race were 0.7% of the population.

There were 1,607 households, of which 36.0% had children under the age of 18 living with them, 61.3% were married couples living together, 8.6% had a female householder with no husband present, 4.5% had a male householder with no wife present, and 25.6% were non-families. 17.6% of all households were made up of individuals, and 5.4% had someone living alone who was 65 years of age or older. The average household size was 2.61 and the average family size was 2.92.

The median age in the town was 41.4 years. 24% of residents were under the age of 18; 6.2% were between the ages of 18 and 24; 26% were from 25 to 44; 32.7% were from 45 to 64; and 11.2% were 65 years of age or older. The gender makeup of the town was 50.4% male and 49.6% female.

2000 census

As of the census of 2000, there were 3,514 people, 1,314 households, 989 families, and 4,834 cows residing in the town. The racial makeup of the town was 98.78% White, 0.06% African American, 0.17% Native American, 0.28% Asian, 0.06% Pacific Islander, 0.11% from other races, and 0.54% from two or more races. Hispanic or Latino of any race were 0.43% of the population.

There were 1,314 households, out of which 38.7% had children under the age of 18 living with them, 64.8% were married couples living together, 7.2% had a female householder with no husband present, and 24.7% were non-families. 17.9% of all households were made up of individuals, and 5.0% had someone living alone who was 65 years of age or older.  The average household size was 2.66 and the average family size was 3.02.

In the town, the population was spread out, with 27.0% under the age of 18, 6.5% from 18 to 24, 32.4% from 25 to 44, 25.1% from 45 to 64, and 8.9% who were 65 years of age or older.  The median age was 36 years. For every 100 females, there were 98.9 males.  For every 100 females age 18 and over, there were 98.5 males.

The median income for a household in the town was $42,500, and the median income for a family was $47,281. Males had a median income of $31,788 versus $22,861 for females. The per capita income for the town was $18,530.  About 4.6% of families and 7.4% of the population were below the poverty line, including 6.6% of those under age 18 and 5.9% of those age 65 or over.

Notable people 

 Nehemiah Abbott (1804–1877), US congressman
 William M. Butterfield (1862–1932), architect

References

Towns in Kennebec County, Maine
Towns in Maine
1792 establishments in Massachusetts